Andrey Solovey (born 13 December 1994) is a Belarusian professional football player who plays for Shakhtyor Soligorsk.

International career
He made his debut for Belarus national football team on 2 June 2021 in a friendly against Azerbaijan. He scored his first international goal on 26 March against India in their 3–0 win.

International goals
Scores and results list Belarus' goal tally first.

Honours
Torpedo-BelAZ Zhodino
Belarusian Cup winner: 2015–16

Gomel
Belarusian Cup winner: 2021–22

Shakhtyor Soligorsk
Belarusian Premier League champion: 2022
Belarusian Super Cup winner: 2023

References

External links
 
 
 Profile at pressball.by

1994 births
Living people
Belarusian footballers
Belarus under-21 international footballers
Belarus international footballers
Association football midfielders
FC Dynamo Brest players
FC Torpedo-BelAZ Zhodino players
FC Slonim-2017 players
FC Lokomotiv Gomel players
FC Gomel players
FC Shakhtyor Soligorsk players